Amata schoutedeni is a moth of the family Erebidae. It was described by Sergius G. Kiriakoff in 1954. It is found in the Democratic Republic of the Congo.

References

 

schoutedeni
Moths described in 1954
Moths of Africa
Endemic fauna of the Democratic Republic of the Congo